Pavol Jantausch (27 June 1870 – 29 June 1947) was a Czechoslovakian priest and Bishop of the Roman Catholic Church. During the Second World War he protested the antisemitic policies of the Nazi aligned Slovak Republic (1939–45).

Biography
Born in Vrbové in 1870, he was ordained a priest in 1893. In 1922 he was appointed Apostolic Administrator of Trnava  and in 1925 he was ordained Titular Bishop of Priene.

Following Adolf Hitler's dismemberment of Czechoslovakia prior to the Second World War, the small and predominantly Catholic and agricultural Slovak region became the Fascist Slovak Republic in 1939, a nominally independent Nazi puppet state. In February 1942, Slovakia agreed to begin deportations of Jews to German concentration camps. Distressing scenes at railway yards of deportees being beaten by Hlinka Guard paramilitary spurred community protest, including from Bishop Pavol Jantausch. Jantausch was active in protecting Jews.

See also

Catholic resistance to Nazism

References

Slovak Roman Catholic priests
Czechoslovak Roman Catholic priests
Catholic resistance to Nazi Germany
Slovak people of World War II
1870 births
1947 deaths